Bhesa is a small genus of woody plants in the family Centroplacaceae. Its natural distribution is from southern China to New Guinea. It was formerly classified in Celastraceae, until a molecular phylogenetic study placed it in the family Centroplacaceae in the order Malpighiales.

There are eight species:

 Bhesa andamanica N.Balach. & Chakrab.
 Bhesa archboldiana (Merr. & L.M.Perry) Ding Hou
 Bhesa ceylanica (Arn. ex Thwaites) Ding Hou
 Bhesa indica (Bedd.) Ding Hou
 Bhesa nitidissima Kosterm.
 Bhesa paniculata Arn.
 Bhesa robusta (Roxb.) Ding Hou
 Bhesa sinica (H.T.Chang & Liang) H.T.Chang & Liang

References

 
Malpighiales genera
Taxonomy articles created by Polbot